Euskelia is a clade of extinct Temnospondyl amphibians. Euskelia is a stem-based taxon including all temnospondyls more closely related to Eryops than to Parotosuchus.

References

Carboniferous temnospondyls
Permian temnospondyls
Triassic temnospondyls
Pennsylvanian first appearances
Early Triassic extinctions

es:Euskelia